Dotsero is an unincorporated community and a census-designated place (CDP) located in and governed by Eagle County, Colorado, United States. The CDP is a part of the Edwards, CO Micropolitan Statistical Area. The population of the Dotsero CDP was 705 at the United States Census 2010. The Gypsum post office (Zip Code 81637) serves the area.

History

Denver and Rio Grande Western Railroad
Dotsero was an important railroad junction point for the Denver and Rio Grande Western Railroad's Denver to Salt Lake City line. Originally the line passed through Dotsero following the Eagle River towards Tennessee Pass and through the Royal Gorge of the Arkansas River en route to Pueblo, Colorado before turning north towards Denver. Through the years, efforts were made to have a more direct connection between Denver and Salt Lake that did not require detouring through Pueblo. The Denver and Salt Lake Railroad (D&SL) built a line west from Denver and entered the Colorado  River canyon near Bond, Colorado, about  Northeast of Dotsero. The D&SL was never finished as a separate route to Salt Lake City; however, it was eventually acquired by the D&RGW, who built a connection between Dotsero and Orestod (Dotsero spelled backwards) near Bond. This connection, commonly known as the Dotsero Cutoff, was completed on June 15, 1934 and finally provided Denver with a direct link to Salt Lake City, making Dotsero the junction between the old and new routes to Denver. After completion the old route over Tennessee pass remained in use as a secondary route, but has been dormant since 1997.
 
Ferdinand Hayden published an extensive survey of central and southwest Colorado in 1877, and used the location of the town of Dotsero as his "Dot Zero" (reference point) for his survey maps. The station name exists from the construction of the standard gauge railroad line to Glenwood Springs in the 1890s.

Geography

Dotsero Volcano
Dotsero is built at the base of Colorado's most recently active volcano, the Dotsero Volcano, which, according to the United States Geological Survey, erupted 4,140 years ago. The volcano is still classified as active by the USGS and is the only active volcano within Colorado.

The main industry at Dotsero for years consisted of making cinderblocks from the volcano.

Demographics

See also

Outline of Colorado
Index of Colorado-related articles
State of Colorado
Colorado cities and towns
Colorado census designated places
Colorado counties
Eagle County, Colorado
Colorado metropolitan areas
Edwards, CO Micropolitan Statistical Area

References

External links

Dotsero @ UncoverColorado.com
Dotsero Volcanic Center
Dotsero Volcano
How Dotsero came by its name
Eagle County website

Census-designated places in Eagle County, Colorado
Census-designated places in Colorado
Colorado populated places on the Colorado River